Cisla may refer to:

Cisla, a municipality in the province of Ávila, Spain
Cisla (Vișeu), a river in Maramureș County, northern Romania
Cîșla, Cantemir, a commune in Cantemir district, Moldova
Cîșla, Telenești, a commune in Telenești district, Moldova